Steven R. David (born 1951) is Professor of International Relations at Johns Hopkins University.  He specializes in international politics and security issues.

Education and positions
David earned his B.A. in political science from Union College in 1972.  In 1975, he completed his M.A. in East Asian studies from Stanford University, and in 1977 received an M.A. from Harvard University in political science.  In 1980, David earned his Ph.D. in political science from Harvard University.  He was a post-doctoral fellow in Harvard's National Security Program for the following year.

In 1981, David came to Johns Hopkins University as an assistant professor of political science.  In 1987 he became as associate professor, and became a full professor in 1991. From 1983 to 2007, David was director of the International Studies Program at JHU; he held the chair of JHU's political science department.  From 1998 to 2003, Steven David was associate dean for academic affairs, and from 2003 to 2004 he served as special assistant to the dean of the Krieger School of Arts and Sciences.

In 2005, David became the vice dean for centers and programs at JHU, providing oversight for ten centers and programs, and in 2007 he became the director of Jewish studies at JHU. David served in that role until 2010,  when he was named vice dean for undergraduate education at JHU.

Teaching philosophy
In 1989, David became the first member of the Johns Hopkins faculty to receive the George E. Owen teaching award twice. He won the award for a third time in 1998. In an interview with a university newspaper following his receipt of the award, David said, "I like the students...Someone once asked me, 'Do you want to spend your life with 18- to 22-year-olds?' and I kinda do. They're enthusiastic, they're fun and they're open-minded. I like that."

Works

Books

Articles and monographs

Reprinted in:

Selected for republication in:

Selected for republication in:

Updated version in:

Updated version selected for publication in:

David, Steven. “Explaining Third World Alignment.” World Politics 43, no. 2 (1991). www.jstor.org/stable/2010472.

References

External links
Johns Hopkins University bio
David CV

Johns Hopkins University faculty
Union College (New York) alumni
Stanford University alumni
Harvard Graduate School of Arts and Sciences alumni
Political science educators
1951 births
Living people
American political scientists